Yaar Meri Zindagi is a 2008 Indian Hindi-language film directed by Ashok Gupta, starring Amitabh Bachchan, Shatrughan Sinha and South actresses Sharada and Sudha Chandran. The film had only a limited release of 20 prints in Mumbai and other parts of Maharashtra.

Cast

Amitabh Bachchan as Dr Ajay Singh
Shatrughan Sinha as Thakur Vikram Singh
Sharada as Radha
Sudha Chandran as Shikha
Jalal Agha as Shankar

Music
"Naache Mera Pyar" - Asha Bhosle
"Piya Tore Nanoya Ke" - Asha Bhosle
"Pyara Ye Rishta Hai Mera" - Asha Bhosle
"Raat Ko Akele Mein Baje Mora Kagna" - Kavita Krishnamurthy
"Raja Ke Aangna Aaye" - Asha Bhosle
"Yaar Meri Zindigi" - Yunus
"Yaar Meri Zindigi v2" - Yunus
"Yaar Meri Zindigi v3" - Sadhana Sargam, Ranjana Joglekar

Production

The shooting for the film started in the year 1971 and was initially directed by Mukul Dutt, but he left the project in 1976 after having numerous problems and creative differences. Then Ashok Gupta took over the mantle as director in 1993 and completed it within a year, but he too had issues in releasing the film.

References

External links

2008 films
2000s Hindi-language films
Films scored by R. D. Burman